Steniodes is a genus of moths of the family Crambidae described by Snellen in 1875.

Species
Steniodes acuminalis (Dyar, 1914)
Steniodes costipunctalis Snellen, 1899
Steniodes declivalis (Dyar, 1914)
Steniodes deltoidalis (Snellen, 1875)
Steniodes dominicalis Schaus, 1924
Steniodes gelliasalis (Walker, 1859)
Steniodes mendica (Hedemann, 1894)
Steniodes nennuisalis (Schaus, 1924)
Steniodes suspensa (Meyrick, 1936)

References

Spilomelinae
Crambidae genera